This is a list of reptiles of Sri Lanka.

The reptilian diversity in Sri Lanka is higher than the diversity of other vertebrates such as mammals and fish with 181 reptile species. All extant reptiles are well documented through research by many local and foreign scientists and naturalists. Sri Lankan herpetologist, Anslem de Silva largely studied the biology and ecology of Sri Lanka snakes, where he documented 96 species of land and sea snakes. Five genera are endemic to Sri Lanka - Aspidura, Balanophis, Cercaspis, Haplocercus, and Pseudotyphlops. Out of them only five of the land snakes are considered potentially deadly and life threatening to humans. Among snakes, 54 are endemic to Sri Lanka. The total increased to 107 with new descriptions of Dendrelaphis, Rhinophis, Aspidura and Dryocalamus.

Lizard diversity in the island has been documented and studied by many local scientists and researchers such as Imesh Nuwan Bandara, Kalana Maduwage, Anjana Silva, Rohan Pethiyagoda, and Kelum Manamendra-Arachchi. There are 111 lizards known from Sri Lanka, with 17 newly discovered in 2006, and two more in 2016 and 2017. One of species was discovered in 2019 from Ensalwatta, Matara. In 2019, seven more endemic day geckos have been discovered by Suranjan Karunaratne and Mendis Wickramasinghe. In December 2019, three more endemic geckos were discovered. In May 2020, another endemic skink was discovered. Three new day gecko species were discovered in 2021.

Apart from them, Sri Lanka is home to two species of crocodiles, and nine species of turtles.

This is a list of reptiles found in Sri Lanka.

Order: Squamata - scaled reptiles

Suborder: Serpentes - snakes

Family: Acrochordidae - wart snakes

Family: Boidae - boas

Family: Pythonidae - pythons

Family: Colubridae - colubers

Family: Cylindrophiidae - pipe snakes

Family: Elapidae - elapids

Subfamily: Hydrophiinae - sea snakes

Family: Typhlopidae - blind snakes

Family: Uropeltidae - shield-tailed snakes

Family: Viperidae - vipers and pit vipers

Suborder: Lacertilia - lizards

Family: Agamidae - agamid lizards

Family: Chamaeleonidae - chameleons

Family: Gekkonidae - geckoes

Family: Lacertidae - wall lizards

Family: Scincidae - skinks

Family: Varanidae - monitor lizards

Order: Crocodilia - crocodiles

Family: Crocodylidae - true crocodiles

Order: Testudines - turtles

Family: Bataguridae - Asian terrapins

Family: Cheloniidae - sea turtles

Family: Dermochelyidae - leatherback turtles

Family: Emydidae - American hard-shelled turtles

Family: Testudinidae - tortoises

Family: Trionychidae - softshells

References

External links
  SrilLankanReptiles.com
 Wildreach.com

.
Reptiles
Sri Lanka
Taxa named by Anslem de Silva
Sri Lanka